The 1881–82 Washington and Lee Generals men's soccer team represented Washington and Lee University during the 1881–82 college soccer season. The Washington and Lee team played one match, where they defeated VMI, 12-1 in their only match of the season. The team was retroactively determined the national champion that year by the American Soccer History Archives and the Intercollegiate Soccer Football Association, for having the best goal differential amongst teams that were undefeated during the 1881-82 academic year.

Schedule 

|-
!colspan=6 style="background:#003399; color:#FFFFFF;"| Regular season
|-

|-
|}

References 

Iowa
1881
1881 in sports in Virginia
1882 in sports in Virginia
College soccer national championship-winning seasons (1866–1904)